Sport Prop s.r.o. is a Czech manufacturer of composite propellers for homebuilt and ultralight aircraft. The company headquarters is located in Prague.

See also
List of aircraft propeller manufacturers

References 

Aircraft propeller manufacturers
Aerospace companies of the Czech Republic